Heath and Holmewood is a civil parish forming part of the district of North East Derbyshire in England.

As its name suggests, the main settlements in the parish are Heath and Holmewood.

See also
Listed buildings in Heath and Holmewood

External links 
Parish Council contact details

Civil parishes in Derbyshire